Grey Blackwell (born 1969) is an American artist who works in online and broadcast animation as well as print illustration. Since 2015, he has owned and operated his own haunted attraction.

Some of his previous illustration clients have included MAD Magazine, Entertainment Weekly and Sport Illustrated for Kids. In 1998, Blackwell received the National Cartoonist Society Newspaper Illustration Award for his work with The News & Observer in Raleigh, NC. From September 2005 - October 2008, he produced a series of animated shorts for The News & Observer's website. Blackwell has also produced animated cartoons for Rivals.com, ESPN.com and Fox Sports Network.

From 2010 through 2012, Blackwell self-produced an animated children's DVD series distributed by Bridgestone Multimedia Group.

From 2013 through 2015, Blackwell contributed illustration for an animated web series for the Solutions Project, an organization co-founded by actor Mark Ruffalo with the goal of accelerating the transition to 100 percent renewable energy use in the United States.

Blackwell is a 1992 graduate of North Carolina State University College of Design. He began his career in newspapers, first working for The Times in Gainesville, Georgia, and later for The Atlanta Journal-Constitution during their coverage of the 1996 Olympic games.

External links
Artist home page
Official YouTube channel
NCS Awards
MAD magazine reference guide

Living people
American cartoonists
1969 births